The Bonifacio Transport Corporation, or more commonly known as BGC Bus or formerly The Fort Bus, is an intercity bus company in Metro Manila, the Philippines, serving routes that connect Makati, Bonifacio Global City, and Taguig.

The company is a subsidiary of the Fort Bonifacio Development Corporation (FBDC), an affiliate company under the Ayala Corporation. The bus system uses the Beep contactless smart card as a mode of electronic payment.

History

Founded in 1998, the Bonifacio Transport Corporation was established under the Fort Bonifacio Development Corporation (FBDC). It was formed through an initial fleet of 24 buses — 10 of which are Mercedes-Benz buses and the rest are Nissan Diesel units — as an intercity transport system to and from the adjacent business districts of Bonifacio Global City and Ayala Center.

In 2008, six Mercedes-Benz O500M 1725 buses were deployed by FBDC, followed by an additional 14 buses to keep up with passenger demand. In the same year, HM Transport Inc. and the Bonifacio Transport Corporation signed an agreement, allowing the use of HM Transport buses to serve routes to and from Bonifacio Global City. As a result, a weekday bus route between the Market! Market! shopping mall in Taguig, EDSA, and Kalayaan Avenue was established.

In 2016, the BGC Bus replaced its TapBGC contactless smart card with AF Payments Inc's Beep card. A limited public trial was conducted from June 11 to 26, and was fully rolled out on June 27, 2016.

Fleet

Bonifacio Transport Corp. utilizes and maintains UD Nissan Diesel, Mercedes-Benz and Higer buses.

Higer
DMMW Aero Adamant (under HM Transport)
Mercedes-Benz
DMMW Aero Extreme
AMC Tourist Star
MCV Evolution C120 LE
Nissan Diesel
Santarosa EXFOH (under HM Transport)

Routes
BGC Bus operates primarily on 11 different routes with terminals at the McKinley Exchange Corporate Center along EDSA in Makati or at the Market! Market! mall in Taguig. On August 7, 2017, express bus routes were introduced. All times are in Philippine Standard Time (UTC+08:00).

See also
 List of bus companies of the Philippines
 Premium Point-to-Point Bus Service

References

Bus companies of the Philippines
Bus transportation in Metro Manila
Companies based in Bonifacio Global City